Champbenoist–Poigny is a railway station in Poigny near Provins, Île-de-France, France. The station is on the Longueville–Esternay railway line. It is served by TER (local) services operated by SNCF. The station is served by Transilien line P (Paris–Verneuil-l'Étang–Longueville–Provins).

External links

 
Transilien network map
Transilien website

Railway stations in Seine-et-Marne
Railway stations in France opened in 1990